The 1983 German motorcycle Grand Prix was the fourth round of the 1983 Grand Prix motorcycle racing season. It took place on the weekend of 6–8 May 1983 at the Hockenheimring.

Classification

500 cc

References

German motorcycle Grand Prix
German
Motorcycle